Viejo smoking  (English title:Old dinner jacket) is a 1930 Argentine short musical film directed and written by Eduardo Morera, based on a play by Florencio Chiarello. It stars Carlos Gardel and Inés Murray.

Cast
Carlos Gardel as El inquilino
Inés Murray as Manuela
César Fiaschi as El amigo
Francisco Canaro

References

External links
 

1930 films
1930s Spanish-language films
1930 musical films
Argentine short films
Tango films
Argentine black-and-white films
Films directed by Eduardo Morera
Argentine musical films
1930 short films
1930s Argentine films